The International Association for Relationship Research (abbreviated IARR) is an international, interdisciplinary learned society dedicated to promoting research on personal relationships. It was formed in 2004 from the merger of the International Network on Personal Relationships (INPR) and the International Society for the Study of Personal Relationships (ISSPR). Its official peer-reviewed journal is Personal Relationships.

References

External links

Organizations established in 2004
International learned societies